Hans Ulrik (born 28 September 1965) is a Danish jazz saxophonist and composer who has recorded with Gary Peacock, Adam Nussbaum, Niels Lan Doky, Audun Kleive, Marilyn Mazur, John Scofield, and Steve Swallow.

Career 
Ulrik studied jazz saxophone at Berklee College of Music in Boston (1984–86). He continued his studies after a visit in New York City (1986) until 1987. Since 1987 he has been the leader of various bands like Pinocchio (1987), Hans Ulrik Fusion (1988–89), Ulrik/Hess Quartet (1989–90), Hans Ulrik Group (1991–95), Wombat (1995–98), Hans Ulrik Jazz & Mambo (1998–2003) and Hans Ulrik Quartet (from 2003).

In addition to various Danish jazz awards Ulrik has received the award of the European Jazz Competition in Leverkusen 1988 the prize for best soloist and 1990. Third prize at the Jazz Festival in Rome. In 2002 he undertook a tour of China, Hong Kong, Malaysia and Australia. In 2005 he joined Steve Swallow at the Montreal Jazz Festival.

Honors 
European Jazz Competition in Leverkusen 1988
Best Soloist in the European Jazz Competition 1990
Third prize at the Jazz Festival in Rome 2002

Discography

As leader
 Fusion (Salut, 1988)
 Ulrik/Hess Quartet (Olufsen, 1990)
 Day After Day (Storyville, 1992)
 Strange World (Stunt, 1994)
 Danske Sange (Stunt, 1998)
 Jazz and Mambo (Stunt, 1998)
 Shortcuts Jazzpar Combo 1999 (Stunt, 2000)
 Jazz & Latin Beats (Stunt, 2001)
 Trio (Stunt, 2002)
 Danish Standards (Stunt, 2003)
 Blue & Purple (Stunt, 2004)
 Tin Pan Aliens (Stunt, 2005)
 Tribal Dance (Stunt, 2006)
 Believe in Spring (Stunt, 2007)
 Slow Procession (Stunt, 2009)
 The Adventures of a Polar Expedition (Cowbell Music, 2010)
 The Christmas Song (Stunt, 2013)
 Equilibrium (Stunt, 2013)
 Suite of Time (Stunt, 2015)

As sideman
With Eivind Aarset
 Light Extracts (Jazzland, 2001)
 Connected (Jazzland, 2004)
 Sonic Codex (Jazzland, 2007)

With Kenneth Bager
 Fragment Eight (Music for Dreams, 2006)
 Fragments from a Space Cadet (Music for Dreams, 2006)
 Fragments from AaSpace Cadet 2 (Music for Dreams, 2010)
 The Sound of Swing Part 2 (Music for Dreams, 2011)

With Jorgen Emborg
 Heart of the Matter (Stunt, 1990)
 Ships in the Night (Stunt, 1993)
 A Circle of Songs (Stunt, 1994)
 Face the Music (Stunt, 1997)
 Emborg's Moonsongs (Stunt, 2005)
 Statements (Gateway Music, 2008)

With Jesper Lundgaard
 Celluloid (Music Mecca, 2005)
 Sculpting (Music Mecca, 2007)
 2016 (Storyville, 2016)

With Marilyn Mazur
 Circular Chant (Storyville, 1995)
 Small Labyrinths (ECM, 1997)
 All the Birds Reflecting + Adventurous (Stunt, 2002)
 Daylight Stories (Stunt, 2004)

With Caecilie Norby
 Queen of Bad Excuses (Blue Note, 1999)
 Slow Fruit (Copenhagen, 2005)
 Arabesque (ACT, 2010)

With others
 Babou, For Once in My Life (RecArt Music, 2005)
 Frans Bak, Den Poppede Hone (Olufsen, 1993)
 Frans Bak, Natsange (Stunt, 1999)
 Peter Belli, Ny Dag Pa Vej (CMC, 2001)
 Hanne Boel, Misty Paradise (EMI, 1994)
 Danish National Symphony Orchestra, Morricone Duel (EuroArts, 2018)
 Danish Radio Big Band, The Impaler (Red Dot Music, 2010)
 Danish Radio Big Band, Merry Christmas, Baby (Red Dot Music, 2009)
 Trine Dyrholm, Et Frossent Ojeblik (It's Magic 1988)
 Anders Frandsen, Anders Frandsen (Kavan, 1992)
 Louise Fribo, Dromte Mig en Drom (EMI, 1999)
 Anne Linnet, Pige Traed Varsomt (Pladecompagniet, 1995)
 Jacob Groth, The Boys from St. Petri (Replay, 1991)
 Judy Niemack, New York Stories (Sunnyside, 2018)
 Stig Kreutzfeldt, Der Er Kun En (Rosen, 1987)
 Lill Lindfors, Har Ar Den Skona Sommar (Virgin, 2006)
 Lisa Nilsson, En Jubileumssamling (Columbia/(Sony, 2010)
 Steen Rasmussen, Canta (Stunt, 2018)
 Sinne Eeg, Mads Vinding, Abrikostraeet (Calibrated, 2005)
 Santa Cruz, Cruzing (Cowbell Music, 2005)
 Santa Cruz, When the Sun Goes Down (Gateway Music, 2009)
 Lene Siel, Aftenstemning (RecArt Music, 2000)
 Curtis Stigers, One More for the Road (Concord Jazz, 2017)

References 

 Sirus W. Pakzad, Hans Ulrik. "It's amazing what the state of Denmark." Jazz Thing 52

External links 
 Official site archived
 Carina Prange. Hans Ulrik's Jazz & Mambo – "Danish Standards" In: Jazzdimensions 15th January 2004

1965 births
Living people
Musicians from Copenhagen
21st-century male musicians
21st-century saxophonists
Danish jazz composers
Danish jazz saxophonists
DR Big Band members
Male jazz composers
Male saxophonists
Storyville Records artists
Stunt Records artists